Albany State University Coliseum is a stadium in Albany, Georgia.  It is primarily used for American football, and is the home field of the Albany State University Golden Rams playing in the Southern Intercollegiate Athletic Conference (SIAC) in the NCAA Division II. The stadium holds 10,000 people and opened in 2004 on the campus. Albany State University has the second largest stadium in the SIAC; tied with Tuskegee with a 10,000 capacity (only behind Benedict College's Charlie W. Johnson Stadium, has a Capacity of 11,000).

References

External links
 Albany State University Coliseum
 Stadium information @ D2football.com

College football venues
Albany State Golden Rams football
Sports venues in Georgia (U.S. state)
Buildings and structures in Albany, Georgia
2004 establishments in Georgia (U.S. state)